Silver 'n Strings Play the Music of the Spheres is an album by jazz pianist Horace Silver, his final released on the Blue Note label, featuring performances by Silver with Tom Harrell, Larry Schneider, Ron Carter, and Al Foster, with vocals by Gregory Hines, Brenda Alford, Carol Lynn Maillard, and  Chapman Roberts, and an overdubbed string section conducted by Wade Marcus.

Reception
The Allmusic review by Scott Yanow awarded the album 2 stars and states: "He was never as strong a lyricist as he was a composer and pianist so the vocals weigh down the music a bit. The songtitles probably kept a few of these pieces from becoming better-known".

Track listing
All compositions and lyrics by Horace Silver
Side One:
 "(The Physical Sphere) The Soul and Its Expression Part One: The Search for Direction" -
 "(The Physical Sphere) The Soul and Its Expression Part Two: Direction Discovered" -
 "(The Physical Sphere) The Soul and Its Expression Part Three: We All Have a Part to Play" -
Side Two:
 "(The Physical Sphere - continued) The Soul and Its Progress Throughout the Spheres Part One: Self Portrait No. 1 (Written 1973)" -
 "(The Physical Sphere - continued) The Soul and Its Progress Throughout the Spheres Part Two: Self Portrait No. 2 (Written 1978)" -
 "(The Physical Sphere  - continued) The Soul and Its Progress Throughout the Spheres Part Three: Self Portrait of the Aspiring Self (Written 1978)" -
 "(The Mental Sphere - Conscious Mind) The Soul's Awareness of Its Character Part One: Character Analysis" -
 "(The Mental Sphere - Conscious Mind) The Soul's Awareness of Its Character Part Two: Negative Patterns of the Subconscious" -
 "(The Mental Sphere - Conscious Mind) The Soul's Awareness of Its Character Part Three: The Conscious and Its Desire for Change" -
Side Three:
 "(The Mental Sphere - Sub-Conscious Mind) The Pygmalion Process Part One: Inner Feelings" -
 "(The Mental Sphere - Sub-Conscious Mind) The Pygmalion Process Part Two: Friends" -
 "(The Mental Sphere - Sub-Conscious Mind) The Pygmalion Process Part Three: Empathy" -
 "(The Mental Sphere - Sub-Conscious Mind) The Pygmalion Process Part Four: Optimism" -
 "(The Mental Sphere - Sub-Conscious Mind) The Pygmalion Process Part Five: Expansion" -
Side Four:
 "(The Spiritual Sphere) The Soul in Communion with the Creator Part One: Communion with the Creator" -
 "(The Spiritual Sphere) The Soul in Communion with the Creator Part Two: The Creator Guides Us" -
 "(The Spiritual Sphere) The Soul in Communion with the Creator Part Three: Progress, Through Dedication and Discipline" -
 "(The Spiritual Sphere) The Soul in Communion with the Creator Part Four: We Expect Positive Results" -
Recorded at Rudy Van Gelder Studio, Englewood Cliffs, NJ, November 3, 1978 (Side One), November 10, 1978 (Side Four), October 26, 1979 (Side Three), November 2, 1979 (Side Two) with strings recorded on December 10, 1979.

Personnel
Horace Silver - piano, arranger
Tom Harrell - trumpet
Larry Schneider - tenor saxophone
Ron Carter - bass
Al Foster - drums
Gregory Hines - vocals (Side One)
Brenda Alford, Carol Lynn Maillard, Chapman Roberts - vocals (Side Three)
Guy Lumia - concertmaster
Aaron Rosand, Marvin Morganstern, Paul Winter, Lewis Eley, Peter Dimitriades, Louann Montesi, Harry Glickman - violin
Harold Coletta, Harry Zaratzian, Seymour Berman, Theodore Israel - viola
Seymour Barab, Jonathan Abramowitz - cello
Gene Bianco - harp
Wade Marcus - arranger, conductor
Dale Oehler - arranger

References

Horace Silver albums
1979 albums
Blue Note Records albums
Albums arranged by Wade Marcus
Albums recorded at Van Gelder Studio